Aridjis is a surname. Notable people with the surname include:

Chloe Aridjis (born 1971), Mexican-American writer
Eva Aridjis (born 1974), Mexican-American film director, daughter of Homero and sister of Chloe
Homero Aridjis (born 1940), Mexican poet, writer, environmental activist, journalist, and diplomat